The A10 is a side road of the A1 road and A2 road going from Kanye to Gaborone, the capital.

Roads in Botswana